Sara Zaker is a Bangladeshi theatre and television actor, director, business entrepreneur and social activist. She was awarded Ekushey Padak by the Government of Bangladesh in 2017.

Early life and education

Zaker was born to Major Salauddin Mohammad Amin and Alia Amin, a former school teacher. She was nicknamed Chixie. Zaker completed her bachelor's and master's from the University of Dhaka in English literature. She was also trained at the British Theater Institute in 1981.

Career

Actress
Zaker joined Nagorik Natya Sampraday, a theater troupe, just after finishing secondary school in 1972. Her first production with the troupe, "Baki Itihash" premiered in February 1973. She went on to perform in Bidogdho Romonikul, Nishiddho Polli,  Shot Manusher Khoje (1976), Dewan Gazi'r Kissa and "Naam-Gotroheen: Manto'r Meyera" (2014).

Zaker directed Ariel Dorfman's Death and the Maiden and Anton Chekhov's The Sea Gull.

Zaker writes a column – Shubondhu Shomipeshu for newspaper Prothom Alo. She is anchoring Ami Ekhon Ki Korbo, a talk show airing on Banglavision channel. She conducts a radio show on Radio Shadhin 92.4fm named Tumi Bolo Amra Shunchhi.

Entrepreneur
Zaker's business career began in 1995 in the field of market research. She is working as the project head of Nayantara Communications since its inception in 2004. Nayantara is the co-producer of Sesame Workshop New York in producing Sisimpur, the Bengali edition of the Sesame Street. She is the managing director of Asiatic 360, director of Asiatic Events Marketing Limited, and the managing director of Ddhoni Chitra Ltd.

Activist
Zaker has led many campaigns and projects related to both male and female rights, women health, family planning and environmental issues. Some notable projects she led are –

 Accelerating progress towards Maternal and Neonatal mortality and Morbidity reduction UNICEF – 2009.
 Advocacy Activity for FP & RH through print and electronic Media UNFPA – 2009
 "Jibon-O-Jibika" Save the Children – USA.
 Male & Female Reproductive Health Campaign (Marie Stopes Clinic Society).
 "Safe Water Campaign" (IDA).
 Water and Environmental Sanitation (WES) Communication Campaign UNICEF- Bangladesh.
 Arsenic Mitigation Campaign UNICEF- Bangladesh.
 Emergency Preparedness Awareness World Health Organization – WHO
 Prevention and Protection of Victims of Human Trafficking in Bangladesh International Organization for Migration – IOM.
 Awareness on Human Trafficking International Organization for Migration – IOM.
 Safe Migration International Organization for Migration – IOM.
 Comprehensive information campaign to enhance public awareness on safe migration in Bangladesh International Organization for Migration – IOM.
 Women Migration Campaign International Organization for Migration – IOM.
 Founder member of the Board of Trustees of Liberation War Museum of Bangladesh.
 Secretary of Nagorik Natya Sampradaya (Workshop & Training Organization & Cultural Affairs).
 Secretariat-In-Charge Dramatic Theater Committee, I.T.I (International Theater Institute).
 Presidium member Dramatic Theater Committee, I.T.I (International Theater Institute). 
 Special Honorable Member of Bangladesh Group Theater Federation.
 Former Chairperson of Secretariat Body, Bangladesh Group Theater Federation.

Personal life
Zaker was married to Aly Zaker until 2020, his death. Aly was an actor, a writer and a business entrepreneur. Zaker has two children, Iresh Zaker and Sriya Sharbojaya. Sriya is associate executive director of Asiatic EXP and Iresh is executive director of Asiatic MCL and an actor. She has a personal blog which is sarazaker.me

Works
Stage plays

Serial dramas
 Ayomoy
Dramas
 Matir Pinjirar Majhe
 Jochnar Ful
 Ekti Prithibi, Ekti Manush
 Somota Chai
Films
 Emiler Goenda Bahini (1980)
 Nodir Naam Modhumoti (1996)
 Itihash Konna (2000)
 Shilalipi (The Inscription) (2004)
 Ontarjatra (2006)
Produced
 Ichche Holo (TV Series) (2009)
 Chuye Dile Mon (2015)
Voice
 The World According to Sesame Street (2006)

Awards
 Sequence Award for Acting (1975)
 Anannya Shirsho Dosh (1995)
 Bishishtho Nattojon – Loko Natto Goshthi (2014)
 Inspiring Change
 Srijan Shamman Award
 Badruddin Hossain Memorial Award (2016)
 Ekushey Padak (2017)

References

Living people
University of Dhaka alumni
Bangladeshi television actresses
Bangladeshi stage actresses
Bangladeshi businesspeople
Recipients of the Ekushey Padak
20th-century Bangladeshi actresses
Year of birth missing (living people)